Domenico Monegario was the traditional sixth Doge of Venice (756–764).

History
He was elected with the support of the Lombard king Desiderius. However, in order to maintain necessary good relations with Byzantium and the Franks, two tribunes were elected annually to limit ducal power. Domenico came to resent these checks and was removed after eight years. 

During his reign, the transformation of the Venetians from fishermen to marine traders happened, with audacious travels as far as the Ionian Islands and the Levant. The art of shipbuilding was improved to make sturdier, faster ships. Venetian wealth increased via trade and the city took on the medieval character it held for the next millennium.

When Pope Paul I demanded donations from Venice to the Holy See, the Doge Monegario was deposed, blinded, and exiled as his two predecessors had been.

Sources
Norwich, John Julius. A History of Venice. Alfred A. Knopf: New York, 1982.

8th-century deaths
8th-century Doges of Venice